The Floral Genome Project is a collaborative research cooperation primarily between Penn State University, University of Florida, and Cornell University. The initial funding came from a grant of $7.4 million from the National Science Foundation. The Floral Genome Project was initiated to bridge the genomic gap between the most broadly studied plant model systems. According to the website, the following are the aims of the project:

External links
Official Website
 

Genome projects
Botany
University of Florida
Cornell University